Brajkovići may refer to:

Brajkovići, Foča, Bosnia and Herzegovina
Brajkovići, Travnik, Bosnia and Herzegovina
Brajkovići, Kosjerić, Serbia

See also
Brajković, surname
Brajkovac (disambiguation)
Brajići (disambiguation)